Graupera is a surname. Notable people with the surname include:

 José Raúl Capablanca y Graupera (1888–1942), Cuban chess player
 Jordi Graupera (born 1981), Spanish researcher